Internal Control: Guidance for Directors on the Combined Code (1999) also known as the "Turnbull Report" was a report drawn up with the London Stock Exchange for listed companies. The committee which wrote the report was chaired by Nigel Turnbull of The Rank Group plc. The report informed directors of their obligations under the Combined Code with regard to keeping good "internal controls" in their companies, or having good audits and checks to ensure the quality of financial reporting and catch any fraud before it becomes a problem.

Revised guidance was issued in 2005. The report was superseded by a further FRC guidance issued in September 2014.

See also
 UK company law
 Corporate Governance
 Cadbury Report (1992), Financial Aspects of Corporate Governance, on corporate governance generally. Pdf file here
 Greenbury Report (1995) on director remuneration. Pdf here
 Hampel Report (1998), review of corporate governance since Cadbury, pdf here and online with the EGCI here
 Myners Report (2001), Institutional Investment in the United Kingdom: A Review on institutional investors, Pdf file here and Review of Progress Report here
 Higgs Report (2003) Review of the role and effectiveness of non-executive directors. Pdf here
 Smith Report (2003) on auditors. Pdf here

Notes

External links
 Text of the revised Turnbull Guidance 2005
 The Financial Reporting Council's website for internal control
 Full text of the combined code 2006 
 Full text of the combined code 2003
 The Financial Services Authority Listing Rules online and in pdf format, under which there is an obligation to comply with the Combined Code, or explain why it is not complied with, under LR 9.8.6(6).

Corporate governance in the United Kingdom
1999 in the United Kingdom
Reports on finance and business